Rebecka is the Swedish form of female name Rebecca.

People named Rebecka
Rebecka Belldegrun (born 1950), American ophthalmologist, businesswoman, and investor
Rebecka Hemse (born 1975), Swedish actress
Rebecka Le Moine (born 1990), Swedish politician
Rebecka Liljeberg (born 1981), Swedish actress
Rebecka Mendelssohn (1811–1858), German salonist
Rebecka Törnqvist (born 1964), Swedish singer
bex (born 1998), bex

Swedish feminine given names